Grands Boulevards, formerly named Rue Montmartre (1931–1998), is a station on Line 8 and Line 9 of the Paris Métro. In 2019, it was the 44th busiest station of the Métro network, with 6,807,424 yearly users.

The section of both lines from just east of Richelieu–Drouot to west of République was built under the Grand Boulevards, partly on the border between the 2nd and 9th arrondissements, that replaced the Louis XIII wall and is in soft ground, which was once the course of the Seine. The lines are built on two levels, with Line 8 on the higher level and Line 9 in the lower level. The platforms are at the sides and the box containing the lines and supporting the road above is strengthened by a central wall between the tracks. There is no interconnection between the lines at Grands Boulevards, with each level having different accesses to the street.

History

Opening
The station was opened on 5 May 1931 with the extension of Line 8 from Richelieu–Drouot to Porte de Charenton. The Line 9 platforms were opened on 10 December 1933 with the extension of the line from Richelieu–Drouot to Porte de Montreuil.

Name change
Until 1998, the station was called "Rue Montmartre". It was renamed to reflect the programme of the former Mayor of Paris, Jean Tiberi, to upgrade the main Boulevards of Paris and because the old name suggested that the station was in the Montmartre district, misleading tourists.

Passenger services

Access
The station has six entrances:
 Entrance 1 - Rue du Faubourg-Montmartre
 Entrance 2 - Boulevard Montmartre, Musée Grévin
 Entrance 3 - Rue Montmartre
 Entrance 4 - Boulevard Poissonnière
 Entrance 5 - Rue Saint-Fiacre
 Entrance 6 - Rue Rougemont

Station layout

Platforms
The platforms of the two lines, 105 meters long, have a particular configuration. Two in number per stopping point, they are isolated in two half-stations separated by a central wall due to their construction in unstable land. Those of line 8 have an elliptical vault while those of line 9, arranged below, have vertical side walls and a horizontal reinforced concrete ceiling.

Their decoration is in the Andreu-Motte style in both cases. Those of line 8 have two red light strips (one per half-station), a bench in flat red tiles and orange "Motte" seats. Those of line 9 have two green light canopies (one per half-station, offset on the side opposite the track), benches in flat green tiles and green Motte seats. These fittings are combined with the flat white ceramic tiles, which are placed horizontally and in staggered rows on the side walls and the vaults of line 8, while they are placed vertically and aligned on the side walls of line 9, the ceiling of the latter being simply painted white. The advertising frames are metallic, and the name of the station is written in Parisine typeface on enamelled plates.

Bus connections
The station is served by lines 20, 32, 39, 74 and 85 of the RATP Bus Network.
The station is served by lines 20, 32, 39, 74 and 85 of the RATP bus network.

Nearby
 Musée Grévin
 Théâtre des Nouveautés
 Théâtre des Variétés
 Passage Jouffroy
 Passage des Panoramas
 Galerie Saint-Marc
 Galerie Montmartre

References

Sources
Roland, Gérard (2003). Stations de métro. D’Abbesses à Wagram. Éditions Bonneton.

Paris Métro stations in the 2nd arrondissement of Paris
Paris Métro stations in the 9th arrondissement of Paris
Railway stations in France opened in 1931